Wish-Bone is an American brand of salad dressing, marinades, dips and pasta salad. The original salad dressing was based on a recipe served at the Wishbone restaurant in Kansas City, Missouri, founded by ex-soldier Phillip Sollomi in 1945 along with Lena Sollomi, Phillip's mother. The Italian dressing served at the Wishbone was based on a recipe from Lena Sollomi's Sicilian family which was a blend of oil, vinegar, herbs and spices. Demand for the salad dressing proved so high that Phillip started a separate operation to produce it for sale, making it by the barrel. The brand was acquired by Lipton, part of the Unilever portfolio, in 1958, and was manufactured in the Kansas City area. In 2013, Pinnacle Foods acquired Wish-Bone from Unilever. In turn, ConAgra acquired Pinnacle Foods on October 26, 2018.

Varieties

Balsamic and Basil Vinaigrette
Raspberry Hazelnut Vinaigrette
Italian¹
House Italian
Robusto Italian¹
Fat Free Italian
Light Italian
Balsamic Vinaigrette
Red Wine Vinaigrette
Light Raspberry Walnut Vinaigrette
Greek Vinaigrette
Ranch
Light Ranch
Fat Free Ranch
Light Parmesan Peppercorn Ranch
Cheddar Bacon Ranch
Buffalo Ranch
Light Buffalo Ranch
Deluxe French
Chipotle Ranch
Light Deluxe French
Sweet and Spicy French
Light Sweet and Spicy French
Chunky Blue Cheese
Light Blue Cheese
Fat Free Chunky Blue Cheese
Creamy Caesar
Light Creamy Caesar
Creamy Italian
Russian
Thousand Island
Light Thousand Island
Light Honey Dijon
Sweet and Spicy Honey Mustard
Western Original
Fat Free Western
Light Western

¹ Indicates Kosher varieties

See also

 List of brand name condiments

References

External links
 Official website

Salad dressings
Pinnacle Foods brands
Brand name condiments
Products introduced in 1945